Joe Bruce may refer to:

 Violent J (Joseph Bruce, born 1972), American rapper and record producer
 Joe Bruce (footballer) (1905–1988), Australian rules footballer